Shwai (Shuway) is a Niger–Congo language in the Heiban family spoken in Kordofan, Sudan. It is also called Ludumor. Dialects are Shabun, Cerumba (Shirumba), Ndano.

References

Critically endangered languages
Heiban languages